Galore is the debut studio album by English duo Thumpers. It was released in February 2014 under Sub Pop Records.

The US release of this album does not contain the title track, having eleven tracks total.

Track listing

References

2014 debut albums
Thumpers albums
Sub Pop albums
Albums produced by Faultline (musician)